Bassil  is a French surname of Ancient Greek origin. It is a derivative of the name  Basil (royal, kingly), which comes from the name Vassilios. It is not to be confused with Bassel. 

This surname recorded in over fifty different spellings from Basil, Bassile, Bazelle, and Bazeley, to Basilon and Vasile, derives from the word "basileios" meaning royal, and originally was given only to children of royal or noble birth. 

In the 4th century a.d. the name was born by St Basillos also known as Basil of Caesarea, the bishop of Caesarea , and long regarded as one of the four fathers of the Eastern (Christian) Church.

History

History in France
The surname Bassil was first found in Burgundy (French: Bourgogne), an administrative and historical region of east-central France where the family has been a prominent family for centuries, and held a family seat with lands and manor. The family were well established in the region of Dijonnais and several members of the family distinguished themselves through their contributions toward the community in which they lived and were rewarded with lands, titles and letters patent confirming their nobility. One of the more interesting records found was that of Pierre Basile (died April 6, 1199), also named Bertran de Gurdun and John Sabroz, a French boy famous for shooting King Richard I of England with a crossbow at the siege of Châlus-Chabrol on March 25, 1199. Apparently, King Richard was not mortally wounded by Basile's bolt but the wound resulted in gangrene which lead to the king's demise.

People

Given name
Bassil Da Costa (1990–2014), Venezuelan university student, killed during the 2014 protests against the Government of Venezuela

Surname

Pierre Basile (died 1199), French boy from Limousin, famous for shooting King Richard I of England with a crossbow
Louis Bassil (born 1695), French merchant in New France
Toni Basil (born 1943), American singer and actress
François Bassil (born 1934), banker and founder of Byblos Bank
Gebran Bassil (born 1970), politician
Ray Bassil (born 1988), Lebanese trapshooter
Semaan Bassil (born 1965), Lebanese banker

Surnames of Arabic origin